Veli is a male Finnish and Estonian given name, meaning brother.
It is also an Ottoman Turkish name, mainly used by Ottoman affiliated populations as a male given name, meaning guardian. Its original etymology in Arabic meaning a "friend of God" when used in a religious-mystical context, and is the singular form of Evliya.

People

Given name
 Veli Acar, Turkish footballer
 Veli Kavlak, Austrian footballer 
 Veli-Pekka Ketola, Finnish ice hockey player
 Veli Kızılkaya, Turkish footballer
 Veli Koota, Finnish boxer
 Veli Lampi, Finnish footballer
 Veli Lehtelä, Finnish rower
 Veli-Matti Lindström, Finnish ski jumper
 Veli Merikoski, Finnish politician and professor
 Veli Nieminen, Finnish gymnast and sports shooter
 Veli Paloheimo, Finnish tennis player
 Veli Saarinen, Finnish cross-country skier
 Veli Watts, An actor from murder most unladylike

Surname
 Adnan Veli Kanık (1916–1972), Turkish journalist, brother of poet Orhan Veli
 Gursel Veli (born 1982), Turkish-Bulgarian footballer
 Hacı Bayram-ı Veli (1352–1430), Turkish poet, founder of the Bayrami Sufi sect
 Haji Bektash Veli, Sufi mystic
 Orhan Veli (1914–1950), Turkish poet
 Bayezid II (Sultân Bayezid-î Velî) was the oldest son and successor of Mehmed II

Mythologic people
 Veļi, dead-soul spirits in Latvian mythology

Places
 Veli (Gagra District), a village in Abkhazia, Georgia
 Veli, a short name for the Croatian village Veli Lošinj
 Veli, a former name of the Armenian town Tsaghkavan, Tavush

Other uses
 Veli (film), a 1985 Indian Tamil film

See also 
 Wali (disambiguation)
 Auliya (disambiguation)

Finnish masculine given names
Turkish-language surnames
Turkish masculine given names